William John Cleary Jr. (born August 19, 1934) is an American former ice hockey player, coach, and athletic administrator. He played on the U.S. National Team that won the 1960 Winter Olympics gold medal, and is a notable Belmont Hill alumnus.

Career

Playing
Cleary was an All-American hockey player at Harvard, starring for two years and setting several team records (many of which still stand) along the way, including most goals in a game (6), longest goal-scoring streak (15), most goals in a season (42) and most points in a single season (89). Cleary's scoring prowess was instrumental in Harvard's invitation to the 1955 NCAA Tournament, the first in school history, and Cleary was named to the All-Tournament First Team after Harvard's third-place finish.

While at Harvard, Bill and his brother Bob played collegiate summer baseball together for the now defunct Sagamore Clouters of the Cape Cod Baseball League.

Taking a year away from college, he won a silver medal as a member of the U.S. ice hockey team at the 1956 Winter Olympics, after turning down a professional-contract offer from the National Hockey League's Montreal Canadiens and Boston Bruins (Cleary opted to go into the insurance business instead and made more money than he probably would have in the NHL). At the 1959 World Ice Hockey Championships, he won the IIHF directorate award for best forward. At the 1960 Winter Olympics, in Squaw Valley, California, Bill and his brother Bob teamed up to win a gold medal with the U.S., with Bill leading the team in scoring through the tournament with 14 points.

Coaching
After the 1960 Olympics Cleary retired as a player and became an ice hockey official for several years before returning to Harvard in 1968 to coach the freshman squad. Bill was quickly promoted to assistant coach of the varsity team and then became the head coach in 1971 when Cooney Weiland retired. Cleary's teams got off to a fast start with a top two finishing in each of his first four years. Though he couldn't manage to win a tournament in the time (conference or national) Cleary had established himself enough to carry through a down period in the late 1970s.

Harvard missed the postseason each year from 1977 to 1981, ending with a losing record in four of those seasons. There was a slight recovery in 1981-82 when Harvard won its division and was able to use it to propel itself into the ECAC title game and receive a subsequent invitation to the 1982 NCAA Tournament despite its rather bland record. The next season saw return to prominence for the Crimson as they won the ECAC Tournament and made the team's first National Title game, losing 6–2 to Wisconsin. For the stark turnaround not only did Cleary receive the Spencer Penrose Award but Mark Fusco was awarded the Hobey Baker Award.

After a brief dip in the standings for 1983-84, Harvard was a national contender for the remainder of the 1980s, winning at least 20 games each year from '85 to '89. Cleary won four consecutive ECAC regular season titles from '86 to '89 (one shared) and reached the National Championship for a second time in 1986, losing 6–5 to Michigan State. That season Cleary coached his second Hobey Baker winner, Scott Fusco, who remains the top career scorer in the history of the program. Three years later Harvard was once again in the title tilt, this time coming out on top with a 4–3 overtime win against Minnesota, garnering not only Harvard's first (and only) National Title, but their third Hobey Baker winner in Lane MacDonald (the team's all-time goal scoring leader).

Cleary coached the Crimson for one more season before moving on to become an administrator for Harvard's athletic department and formally retired on June 30, 2001.

Awards and honors

Among many of the honors he has received include being named to the NCAA Ice Hockey 50th Anniversary team, chosen as the US Hockey Player of the Decade (1956–1966), tabbed as one of the 100 Golden Olympians by the USOC as well as being named the 33rd-best Massachusetts athlete in the 20th century by Sports Illustrated and #68 on the Boston Globe's top 100 New England athletes of the 20th century. Additionally Cleary is the only person in the history of Harvard University's athletic department to have his jersey number (4) retired. Cleary's three Hobey Baker winners ties him for having coached the most players ever with Mike Sertich and Doug Woog.

Cleary was the driving force behind the structure of ECAC Hockey and a mentor to several successful college coaches, including 1987 CCHA Coach of the Year Val Belmonte. The Cleary Cup, named in his honor, is awarded to the ECAC's regular-season champion.

Cleary was Ryan O/Neal's stand-in for key ice hockey action scenes in the 1970 film, Love Story, which was about a Harvard hockey player protagonist.

Head coaching record

References

External links

1934 births
American men's ice hockey centers
Bourne Braves players
Cape Cod Baseball League players (pre-modern era)
Harvard Crimson athletic directors
Harvard Crimson men's ice hockey coaches
Harvard Crimson men's ice hockey players
Ice hockey coaches from Massachusetts
Ice hockey players at the 1956 Winter Olympics
Ice hockey players at the 1960 Winter Olympics
IIHF Hall of Fame inductees
Lester Patrick Trophy recipients
Living people
Medalists at the 1956 Winter Olympics
Medalists at the 1960 Winter Olympics
Olympic gold medalists for the United States in ice hockey
Olympic silver medalists for the United States in ice hockey
Sportspeople from Cambridge, Massachusetts
United States Hockey Hall of Fame inductees
AHCA Division I men's ice hockey All-Americans
Ice hockey players from Massachusetts